Jamia Tur Rasheed, Karachi is an Islamic seminary in Karachi, Pakistan. The seminary was established by Rasheed Ahmad Ludhianvi. It is accredited degree awarding institute by Ministry of Federal Education and Professional Training and the Higher Education Commission. The seminary has 36 departments including "Kulyatush Shariyah". It also runs female schools including "Jamia Umm Habībah lil-Banāt", "Jamia Hafsa lil-Banāt" and "Al-Bairuni Girls Secondary School".

Mufti Abdul Rahim is the current head of the seminary. The seminary co-formed "Majma-ul-Uloom Al-Islamia" (Board of Islamic Sciences) along with Jamia Binoria in May 2021, to reconcile between secular and religious education in the "madrasas".
In December 2022 the jamia established Al-Ghazali University.

History
The Jamia Tur Rasheed was founded by Rashid Ahmed Ludhianvi. The background to its foundation was to have such a "Darul Ifta" (juristic council) which limits itself to issues that do not exist in any other seminary. The department of "Tamrīn-e-Ifta" did not exist in any other seminary in Pakistan, and it inspired Ludhyanwi to setup the new seminary in Ahsanabad. The seminary has 36 departments.

The departments include "Mahd al-Rashīd al-Arabi" which promotes the Arabic language, and "Takhassus fi al-iftā", which has the credit of being first such department in whole of the Pakistan. Ludhyanwi established the department in 1964. The department teaches astronomy and geography as well. The department of communication in the seminary was started by Mateen-ur-Rehman Murtaza, a former chairman of Karachi University's mass communication department.

The seminary started its "Kulyatush-Shariyah" program, and department in 2003 for the university students having top grades, to equip them with traditional Islamic sciences in a span of four years.

In February 2021, the Ministry of Federal Education and Professional Training and the Higher Education Commission accredited the Jamia Tur Rasheed as a degree awarding institute. Its degree was approved to be equivalent to a double MA.

In May 2021, Jamia Tur Rasheed formed a new board, "Majma'a Uloom al-Islāmiya" along with Jamia Binoria, disaffiliating itself from the Wifaqul Madaris. The new board is approved by the Ministry of Federal Education and Professional Training, and aims "to promote modern education with religious studies at "madrasas" so that students of seminaries could avail the equal opportunity and play their role in the development of society as well", according to the Academia Magazine.

Sub Institutions
The "Jamia Umm Habībah lil-Banāt", "Jamia Hafsa lil-Banāt", "Al-Bairuni Girls Secondary School" and "Karachi Institute of Management and Sciences (KIMS)" run under the Jamia Tur Rasheed where girls study traditional Islamic sciences along with the secular classes. The Jamia also runs "Al-Bairuni Model Secondary School" and Intermediate College, both approved and accredited by the Government of Sindh.

JTR Media house
The seminary has a media house, based on its three-vision slogan, "Education, Broadcast and Service". The seminary aims to start a educational web channel and a Satellite TV channel.

Faculty
 Syed Adnan Kakakhail
 Tariq Masood

Publications
The seminary publishes:
 Weekly BachoN ka Islām, reportedly read by more than 100,000 kids.
 Weekly Khawāteen ka Islām
 Shariah and Business, reportedly seen as the biggest magazine on the topic in Urdu.
 The Truth, published in English.

See also
Jamia Binoria

References

External links
 Jamia Tur Rasheed website

Islamic universities and colleges in Pakistan
Universities and colleges in Karachi
1977 establishments in Pakistan
Educational institutions established in 1977
Deobandi Islamic universities and colleges
Jamia Tur Rasheed, Karachi